Eero Somervuori (born February 7, 1979) is a Finnish former professional ice hockey forward. He was drafted 170th overall in the 1997 NHL Entry Draft by the Tampa Bay Lightning, but played mainly in the Finnish Liiga and Swedish Elitserien. 

Somervuori won the Finnish Championship twice, in 1996/97 with Jokerit and 2004/05 with Kärpät, and the Swedish championship once, in 2008/09 with Färjestad BK. He played 729 games in the Liiga, also appearing for HPK of Hämeenlinna, Helsinki IFK, Espoo Blues and Rauman Lukko.

Career statistics

Regular season and playoffs

International

External links

1979 births
Living people
People from Järvenpää
HC Ambrì-Piotta players
Brynäs IF players
Färjestad BK players
Finnish ice hockey forwards
Hamilton Bulldogs (AHL) players
HIFK (ice hockey) players
HPK players
Jokerit players
Tampa Bay Lightning draft picks